Mirai no Theme/Uta no Kisha is the fifty-first single (excluding reissues) released by Japanese singer-songwriter Tatsuro Yamashita, released in July 2018. This work contains two songs by Tatsuro Yamashita for the film "Mirai".

Overview
This was the second time Yamashita produced a song for Mamoru Hosoda since his 2009 film "Summer Wars". Moreover, this was the first time he produced two songs for a movie/drama. Both songs are later included in his 2022 album Softly containing new mixes.

"Mirai no Theme" uses an up-tempo pop tune suitable for the opening of the movie. Meanwhile, The ending theme, "Uta no Kisha" has a bright and sad tune, which is suitable for ending the movie. In addition, a live version of the theme song "Bokura no Natsu no Yume" from the animated movie "Summer Wars" was included in the single.

The artwork of the first limited edition features the main visual of the movie, and the regular edition features "Tatsuro-kun" (drawn by Miki Tori) riding a motorcycle.

Track listing

Personnel

ミライのテーマ [Mirai no Theme]

Tatsuro Yamashita: Computer Programming, Acoustic Guitar, Electric Guitar, Percussion & Background Vocals

Takumi Ogasawara: Drums

Koki Ito: Electric Bass

Hiroyuki Namba: Acoustic Piano

Yota Miyazato: Alto Sax Solo

Shigeaki Hashimoto: Computer Programming & Synthesizer Operation

うたのきしゃ [Uta no Kisha]

Tatsuro Yamashita: Computer Programming, Drum Programming, Acoustic Guitar, Electric Guitar, Keyboards, Percussion & Background

Koki Ito: Electric Bass

Hiroyuki Namba: Acoustic Piano

Youichi Murata: Trombone

Koji Nishimura: Trumpet

Takuo Yamamoto: Tenor Sax & Baritone Sax

Shigeaki Hashimoto: Computer Programming & Synthesizer Operation

僕らの夏の夢 [Bokura no Natsu no Yume] (Acoustic Live Version)

Tatsuro Yamashita: Acoustic Guitar

Koki Ito: Electric Bass

Hiroyuki Namba: Acoustic Piano

Recorded Live at Hiroshima Club Quattro. April 25, 2018.

Charts

Release history

References

2018 singles
2018 songs
Japanese-language songs